The Closure & Container Manufacturers Association (CCMA) is a United States trade association of manufacturers who produce closures and containers. Only manufacturers of plastic containers are represented in the association, although this may change in time.

Purpose
The CCMA exists to promote voluntary industry standards, and to act as the industry's liaison with government, academia, and other allied trade associations.

Activities
The CCMA has two major committees:

 The Closure Manufacturers Committee: (a) promotes efficiency in the closure industry; (b) develops voluntary standard drawings for closures; (c) makes available to members technical data about closures; (d) liaises with other closure manufacturer trade organizations worldwide to attempt to create voluntary worldwide standards for closures; (e) works with the National Institute of Standards and Technology to create industry standards compatible with legal requirements; and (f) works with the Consumer Product Safety Commission to promote childproof closures to prevent accidental poisoning.

 The Plastic Container Manufacturers Committee: (a) develops voluntary standards for containers; (b) makes available to members technical data about containers; and (c)  liaises with other container manufacturer trade organizations worldwide to attempt to create voluntary worldwide standards for containers.

External links
CCMA Official Website
Aluminium Can Factory

Trade associations based in the United States
Containers